West Nile virus (WNV) is a single-stranded RNA virus that causes West Nile fever. It is a member of the family Flaviviridae, from the genus Flavivirus, which also contains the Zika virus, dengue virus, and yellow fever virus. The virus is primarily transmitted by mosquitoes, mostly species of Culex. The primary hosts of WNV are birds, so that the virus remains within a "bird–mosquito–bird" transmission cycle. The virus is genetically related to the Japanese encephalitis family of viruses.

Humans and horses both exhibit disease symptoms from the virus, and symptoms rarely occur in other animals. Identification of the human disease was first made in 1937 in Uganda and in the latter half of the 20th century spread to many other parts of the world.

Structure
Like most other flaviviruses, WNV is an enveloped virus with icosahedral symmetry.  Electron microscope studies reveal a 45–50 nm virion covered with a relatively smooth protein shell; this structure is similar to the dengue fever virus, another Flavivirus. The protein shell is made of two structural proteins: the glycoprotein E and the small membrane protein M. Protein E has numerous functions including receptor binding, viral attachment, and entry into the cell through membrane fusion.

The outer protein shell is covered by a host-derived lipid membrane, the viral envelope. The flavivirus lipid membrane has been found to contain cholesterol and phosphatidylserine, but other elements of the membrane have yet to be identified. The lipid membrane has many roles in viral infection, including acting as signaling molecules and enhancing entry into the cell. Cholesterol, in particular, plays an integral part in WNV entering a host cell. The two viral envelope proteins, E and M, are inserted into the membrane.

The RNA genome is bound to capsid (C) proteins, which are 105 amino-acid residues long, to form the nucleocapsid. The capsid proteins are one of the first proteins created in an infected cell; the capsid protein is a structural protein whose main purpose is to package RNA into the developing viruses. The capsid has been found to prevent apoptosis by affecting the Akt pathway.

Genome

WNV is a positive-sense, single-stranded RNA virus. Its genome is approximately 11,000 nucleotides long and is flanked by 5′ and 3′ non-coding stem loop structures. The coding region of the genome codes for three structural proteins and seven nonstructural (NS) proteins, proteins that are not incorporated into the structure of new viruses. The WNV genome is first translated into a polyprotein and later cleaved by virus and host proteases into separate proteins (i.e. NS1, C, E).

Structural proteins
Structural proteins (C, prM/M, E) are capsid, precursor membrane proteins, and envelope proteins, respectively. The structural proteins are located at the 5′ end of the genome and are cleaved into mature proteins by both host and viral proteases.

Nonstructural proteins

Nonstructural proteins consist of NS1, NS2A, NS2B, NS3, NS4A, NS4B, and NS5. These proteins mainly assist with viral replication or act as proteases. The nonstructural proteins are located near the 3′ end of the genome.

Life cycle

Once WNV has successfully entered the bloodstream of a host animal, the envelope protein, E, binds to attachment factors called glycosaminoglycans on the host cell. These attachment factors aid entry into the cell, however, binding to primary receptors is also necessary. Primary receptors include DC-SIGN, DC-SIGN-R, and the integrin αvβ3. By binding to these primary receptors, WNV enters the cell through clathrin-mediated endocytosis. As a result of endocytosis, WNV enters the cell within an endosome.

The acidity of the endosome catalyzes the fusion of the endosomal and viral membranes, allowing the genome to be released into the cytoplasm. Translation of the positive-sense single-stranded RNA occurs at the endoplasmic reticulum; the RNA is translated into a polyprotein which is then cleaved by both host and viral proteases NS2B-NS3 to produce mature proteins.

In order to replicate its genome, NS5, a RNA polymerase, forms a replication complex with other nonstructural proteins to produce an intermediary negative-sense single-stranded RNA; the negative-sense strand serves as a template for synthesis of the final positive-sense RNA. Once the positive-sense RNA has been synthesized, the capsid protein, C, encloses the RNA strands into immature virions. The rest of the virus is assembled along the endoplasmic reticulum and through the Golgi apparatus, and results in non-infectious immature virions. The E protein is then glycosylated and prM is cleaved by furin, a host cell protease, into the M protein, thereby producing an infectious mature virion. The mature viruses are then secreted out of the cell.

Phylogeny

WNV is one of the Japanese encephalitis antigenic serocomplex of viruses, together with Japanese encephalitis virus, Murray Valley encephalitis virus, Saint Louis encephalitis virus and some other flaviviruses. Studies of phylogenetic lineages have determined that WNV emerged as a distinct virus around 1000 years ago. This initial virus developed into two distinct lineages. Lineage 1 and its multiple profiles is the source of the epidemic transmission in Africa and throughout the world. Lineage 2 was considered an African zoonosis. However, in 2008, lineage 2, previously only seen in horses in sub-Saharan Africa and Madagascar, began to appear in horses in Europe, where the first known outbreak affected 18 animals in Hungary. Lineage 1 West Nile virus was detected in South Africa in 2010 in a mare and her aborted fetus; previously, only lineage 2 West Nile virus had been detected in horses and humans in South Africa. Kunjin virus is a subtype of West Nile virus endemic to Oceania. A 2007 fatal case in a killer whale in Texas broadened the known host range of West Nile virus to include cetaceans.

Since the first North American cases in 1999, the virus has been reported throughout the United States, Canada, Mexico, the Caribbean, and Central America. There have been human cases and equine cases, and many birds are infected. The Barbary macaque, Macaca sylvanus, was the first nonhuman primate to contract WNV. Both the American and Israeli strains are marked by high mortality rates in infected avian populations; the presence of dead birds—especially Corvidae—can be an early indicator of the arrival of the virus.

Host range and transmission

The natural hosts for WNV are birds and mosquitoes. Over 300 different species of bird have been shown to be infected with the virus.  Some birds, including the American crow (Corvus brachyrhynchos), blue jay (Cyanocitta cristata) and greater sage-grouse (Centrocercus urophasianus), are killed by the infection, but others survive. The American robin (Turdus migratorius) and house sparrow (Passer domesticus) are thought to be among the most important reservoir species in N. American and European cities. Brown thrashers (Toxostoma rufum), gray catbirds (Dumetella carolinensis), northern cardinals (Cardinalis cardinalis), northern mockingbirds (Mimus polyglottos), wood thrushes (Hylocichla mustelina) and the dove family are among the other common N. American birds in which high levels of antibodies against WNV have been found.

WNV has been demonstrated in a large number of mosquito species, but the most significant for viral transmission are Culex species that feed on birds, including Culex pipiens, C. restuans, C. salinarius, C. quinquefasciatus, C. nigripalpus, C. erraticus and C. tarsalis. Experimental infection has also been demonstrated with soft tick vectors, but is unlikely to be important in natural transmission.

WNV has a broad host range, and is also known to be able to infect at least 30 mammalian species, including humans, some non-human primates, horses, dogs and cats. Some infected humans and horses experience disease but dogs and cats rarely show symptoms. Reptiles and amphibians can also be infected, including some species of crocodiles, alligators, snakes, lizards and frogs. Mammals are considered incidental or dead-end hosts for the virus: they do not usually develop a high enough level of virus in the blood (viremia) to infect another mosquito feeding on them and carry on the transmission cycle; some birds are also dead-end hosts.

In the normal rural or enzootic transmission cycle, the virus alternates between the bird reservoir and the mosquito vector. It can also be transmitted between birds via direct contact, by eating an infected bird carcass or by drinking infected water. Vertical transmission between female and offspring is possible in mosquitoes, and might potentially be important in overwintering. In the urban or spillover cycle, infected mosquitoes that have fed on infected birds transmit the virus to humans. This requires mosquito species that bite both birds and humans, which are termed bridge vectors. The virus can also rarely be spread through blood transfusions, organ transplants, or from mother to baby during pregnancy, delivery, or breastfeeding. Unlike in birds, it does not otherwise spread directly between people.

Disease

Humans

Horses
Severe disease may also occur in horses. Several vaccines for these animals are now available. Before the availability of veterinary vaccines, around 40% of horses infected in North America died.

Epidemiology 
According to the Center for Disease Control, infection with West Nile Virus is seasonal in temperate zones. Climates that are temperate, such as those in the United States and Europe, see peak season from July to October. Peak season changes depending on geographic region and warmer and humid climates can see longer peak seasons. All ages are equally likely to be infected but there is a higher amount of death and neuroinvasive West Nile Virus in people 60–89 years old. People of older age are more likely to have adverse effects.

There are several modes of transmission, but the most common cause of infection in humans is by being bitten by an infected mosquito. Other modes of transmission include blood transfusion, organ transplantation, breast-feeding, transplacental transmission, and laboratory acquisition. These alternative modes of transmission are extremely rare.

Prevention 
Prevention efforts against WNV mainly focus on preventing human contact with and being bitten by infected mosquitoes. This is twofold, first by personal protective actions and second by mosquito-control actions. When a person is in an area that has WNV, it is important to avoid outdoor activity, and if they go outside they should use a mosquito repellent with DEET. A person can also wear clothing that covers more skin, such as long sleeves and pants. Mosquito control can be done at the community level and include surveillance programs and control programs including pesticides and reducing mosquito habitats. This includes draining standing water. Surveillance systems in birds is particularly useful. If dead birds are found in a neighborhood, the event should be reported to local authorities. This may help health departments do surveillance and determine if the birds are infected with West Nile Virus.

Despite the commercial availability of four veterinary vaccines for horses, no human vaccine has progressed beyond phase II clinical trials. Efforts have been made to produce a vaccine for human use and several candidates have been produced but none are licensed to use. The best method to reduce the risk of infections is avoiding mosquito bites. This may be done by eliminating standing pools of water, such as in old tires, buckets, gutters, and swimming pools. Mosquito repellent, window screens, mosquito nets, and avoiding areas where mosquitoes occur may also be useful.

Climate change 

Like other tropical diseases which are expected to have increased spread due to climate change, there is concern that changing weather conditions will increase West Nile Virus spread. Climate change will affect disease rates, ranges, seasonality and affects the distribution of West Nile Virus.

Projected changes in flood frequency and severity can bring new challenges in flood risk management, allowing for increased mosquito populations in urban areas. Weather conditions affected by climate change including temperature, precipitation and wind may affect the survival and reproduction rates of mosquitoes, suitable habitats, distribution, and abundance. Ambient temperatures drive mosquito replication rates and transmission of WNV by affecting the peak season of mosquitoes and geographic variations. For example, increased temperatures can affect the rate of virus replication, speed up the virus evolution rate, and viral transmission efficiency. Furthermore, higher winter temperatures and warmer spring may lead to larger summer mosquito populations, increasing the risk for WNV. Similarly, rainfall may also drive mosquito replication rates and affect the seasonality and geographic variations of the virus. Studies show an association between heavy precipitation and higher incidence of reported WNV. Likewise, wind is another environmental factor that serves as a dispersal mechanism for mosquitoes.

Mosquitoes have extremely wide environmental tolerances and a nearly ubiquitous geographical distribution, being present on all major land masses except Antarctica and Iceland. Nevertheless, changes in climate and land use on ecological timescales can variously expand or fragment their distribution patterns, raising consequent concerns for human health.

See also 

 West Nile fever
 West Nile virus in the United States

References

External links 
 Species Profile - West Nile Virus, National Invasive Species Information Center, United States National Agricultural Library. Lists general information and resources for West Nile Virus

Flaviviruses